Mivaleh may refer to:
Mivaleh-ye Olya
Mivaleh Sofla